{{DISPLAYTITLE:C21H24N2O2}}
The molecular formula C21H24N2O2 (molar mass: 336.427 g/mol) may refer to:

 Apovincamine, an alkaloid
 Catharanthine
 Dehydrosecodine
 LY-272,015
 S-15535, a piperazine drug
 Tabersonine